"Winning" is a pop rock single originally written and recorded by Russ Ballard on his 1976 album of the same name. It was subsequently recorded by Latin rock band Santana for the 1981 album, Zebop! The lead vocal on the Santana version was performed by Alex Ligertwood. It was the sixth track on the album and was released as the third single (backed with "Brightest Star") and as a promotional music video.

The Santana version reached number 2 on the Mainstream Rock Chart and number 17 on the U.S. Billboard Hot 100. The song reached number 12 in South Africa.

Other versions
"Winning" was also recorded by Rock/R&B singer Nona Hendryx (formerly of Labelle) for her 1977 debut solo album.

"Winning" was also recorded by Norwegian heavy metal singer Jørn Lande on his 2020 album, Heavy Rock Radio II: Executing The Classics.

"Winning" was also recorded by country singer Keith Urban, and released as a bonus track on the Target deluxe edition of his 2010 album, Get Closer.

References

1976 songs
Santana (band) songs
1981 singles
Songs written by Russ Ballard
Song recordings produced by Muff Winwood
Epic Records singles
Columbia Records singles